RDX (abbreviation of "Research Department eXplosive") or hexogen, among other names, is an organic compound with the formula (O2N2CH2)3. It is a white solid without smell or taste, widely used as an explosive. Chemically, it is classified as a nitroamine alongside HMX, which is a more energetic explosive than TNT. It was used widely in World War II and remains common in military applications.

RDX is often used in mixtures with other explosives and plasticizers or phlegmatizers (desensitizers); it is the explosive agent in C-4 plastic explosive. It is stable in storage and is considered one of the most energetic and brisant of the military high explosives, with a relative effectiveness factor of 1.60.

Name
RDX is also less commonly known as cyclonite, hexogen (particularly in Russian, French, German and German-influenced languages), T4, and, chemically, as cyclotrimethylenetrinitramine. In the 1930s, the Royal Arsenal, Woolwich, started investigating cyclonite to use against German U-boats that were being built with thicker hulls. The goal was to develop an explosive more energetic than TNT. For security reasons, Britain termed cyclonite "Research Department Explosive" (R.D.X.). The term RDX appeared in the United States in 1946. The first public reference in the United Kingdom to the name RDX, or R.D.X., to use the official title, appeared in 1948; its authors were the managing chemist, ROF Bridgwater, the chemical research and development department, Woolwich, and the director of Royal Ordnance Factories, Explosives; again, it was referred to as simply RDX.

Usage

RDX was widely used during World War II, often in explosive mixtures with TNT such as Torpex, Composition B, Cyclotols, and H6. RDX was used in one of the first plastic explosives. The bouncing bomb depth charges used in the "Dambusters Raid" each contained  of Torpex; The Tallboy and Grand Slam bombs designed by Wallis also used Torpex.

RDX is believed to have been used in many bomb plots, including terrorist plots.

RDX is the base for a number of common military explosives:
Composition A: Granular explosive consisting of RDX and plasticizing wax, such as composition A-3 (91% RDX coated with 9% wax) and composition A-5 (98.5 to 99.1% RDX coated with 0.95 to 1.54% stearic acid).
Composition B: Castable mixtures of 59.5% RDX and 39.4% TNT with 1% wax as desensitizer.
Composition C: The original composition C was used in World War II, but there have been subsequent variations including C-2, C-3, and C-4. C-4 consists of RDX (91%); a plasticizer, dioctyl sebacate (5.3%); and a binder, which is usually polyisobutylene (2.1%); and oil (1.6%). 
Composition CH-6: 97.5% RDX, 1.5% calcium stearate, 0.5% polyisobutylene, and 0.5% graphite
DBX (Depth Bomb Explosive): Castable mixture consisting of 21% RDX, 21% ammonium nitrate, 40% TNT, and 18% powdered aluminium, developed during World War II, it was to be used in underwater munitions as a substitute for Torpex employing only half the amount of then-scarce RDX, as the supply of RDX became more adequate, however, the mixture was shelved
Cyclotol: Castable mixture of RDX (50–80%) with TNT (20–50%) designated by the amount of RDX/TNT, such as Cyclotol 70/30
HBX: Castable mixtures of RDX, TNT, powdered aluminium, and D-2 wax with calcium chloride
H-6: Castable mixture of RDX, TNT, powdered aluminum, and paraffin wax (used as a phlegmatizing agent)
PBX: RDX is also used as a major component of many polymer-bonded explosives (PBX); RDX-based PBXs typically consist of RDX and at least thirteen different polymer/co-polymer binders. Examples of RDX-based PBX formulations include, but are not limited to: PBX-9007, PBX-9010, PBX-9205, PBX-9407, PBX-9604, PBXN-106, PBXN-3, PBXN-6, PBXN-10, PBXN-201, PBX-0280, PBX Type I, PBXC-116, PBXAF-108, etc.
Semtex (trade name): Plastic demolition explosive containing RDX and PETN as major energetic components 
Torpex: 42% RDX, 40% TNT, and 18% powdered aluminium; the mixture was designed during World War II and used mainly in underwater ordnance 

Outside military applications, RDX is also used in controlled demolition to raze structures. The demolition of the Jamestown Bridge in the U.S. state of Rhode Island was one instance where RDX shaped charges were used to remove the span.

Synthesis
RDX is classified by chemists as a hexahydro-1,3,5-triazine derivative. In laboratory settings (industrial routes are described below separately) it is obtained by treating hexamine with white fuming nitric acid.

This nitrolysis reaction also produces Bis-oxadiazole, ammonium nitrate, and water as byproducts. The overall reaction is:
C6H12N4 + 10 HNO3 → C3H6N6O6 + 3 CH2(ONO2)2 + NH4NO3 + 3 H2O
Modern syntheses employ hexahydro triacyl triazine as it avoids formation of HMX.

History
RDX was used by both sides in World War II. RDX had the major advantages of possessing greater explosive force than TNT, used in World War I, and requiring no additional raw materials for its manufacture.

Germany
RDX was reported in 1898 by Georg Friedrich Henning, who obtained a German patent (patent No. 104280) for its manufacture by nitrolysis of hexamine (hexamethylenetetramine) with concentrated nitric acid. In this patent, the medical properties of RDX were mentioned; however, three further German patents obtained by Henning in 1916 proposed its use in smokeless propellants. The German military started investigating its use in 1920, referring to it as hexogen. Research and development findings were not published further until Edmund von Herz, described as an Austrian and later a German citizen, obtained a British patent in 1921 and a United States patent in 1922. Both patent claims were initiated in Austria; and described the manufacture of RDX by nitrating hexamethylenetetramine. The British patent claims included the manufacture of RDX by nitration, its use with or without other explosives, its use as a bursting charge and as an initiator. The U.S. patent claim was for the use of a hollow explosive device containing RDX and a detonator cap containing RDX. In the 1930s, Germany developed improved production methods.

During World War II, Germany used the code names W Salt, SH Salt, K-method, the E-method, and the KA-method. These names represented the identities of the developers of the various chemical routes to RDX. The W-method was developed by Wolfram in 1934 and gave RDX the code name "W-Salz". It used sulfamic acid, formaldehyde, and nitric acid. SH-Salz (SH salt) was from Schnurr, who developed a batch-process in 1937–38 based on nitrolysis of hexamine. The K-method, from Knöffler, involved addition of ammonium nitrate to the hexamine/nitric acid process. The E-method, developed by Ebele, proved to be identical to the Ross and Schiessler process described below. The KA-method, also developed by Knöffler, turned out to be identical to the Bachmann process described below.

The explosive shells fired by the MK 108 cannon and the warhead of the R4M rocket, both used in Luftwaffe fighter aircraft as offensive armament, both used hexogen as their explosive base.

UK
In the United Kingdom (UK), RDX was manufactured from 1933 by the research department in a pilot plant at the Royal Arsenal in Woolwich, London, a larger pilot plant being built at the RGPF Waltham Abbey just outside London in 1939. In 1939 a twin-unit industrial-scale plant was designed to be installed at a new  site, ROF Bridgwater, away from London and production of RDX started at Bridgwater on one unit in August 1941. The ROF Bridgwater plant brought in ammonia and methanol as raw materials: the methanol was converted to formaldehyde and some of the ammonia converted to nitric acid, which was concentrated for RDX production. The rest of the ammonia was reacted with formaldehyde to produce hexamine. The hexamine plant was supplied by Imperial Chemical Industries. It incorporated some features based on data obtained from the United States (U.S.). RDX was produced by continually adding hexamine and concentrated nitric acid to a cooled mixture of hexamine and nitric acid in the nitrator. The RDX was purified and processed for its intended use; recovery and reuse of some methanol and nitric acid also was carried out. The hexamine-nitration and RDX purification plants were duplicated (i.e. twin-unit) to provide some insurance against loss of production due to fire, explosion, or air attack.

The United Kingdom and British Empire were fighting without allies against Nazi Germany until the middle of 1941 and had to be self-sufficient. At that time (1941), the UK had the capacity to produce  (160,000 lb) of RDX per week; both Canada, an allied country and self-governing dominion within the British Empire, and the U.S. were looked upon to supply ammunition and explosives, including RDX. By 1942 the Royal Air Force's annual requirement was forecast to be  of RDX, much of which came from North America (Canada and the U.S.).

Canada
A different method of production to the Woolwich process was found and used in Canada, possibly at the McGill University department of chemistry. This was based on reacting paraformaldehyde and ammonium nitrate in acetic anhydride. A UK patent application was made by Robert Walter Schiessler (Pennsylvania State University) and James Hamilton Ross (McGill, Canada) in May 1942; the UK patent was issued in December 1947. Gilman states that the same method of production had been independently discovered by Ebele in Germany prior to Schiessler and Ross, but that this was not known by the Allies. Urbański provides details of five methods of production, and he refers to this method as the (German) E-method.

UK, U.S., and Canadian production and development
At the beginning of the 1940s, the major U.S. explosive manufacturers, E. I. du Pont de Nemours & Company and Hercules, had several decades of experience of manufacturing trinitrotoluene (TNT) and had no wish to experiment with new explosives. U.S. Army Ordnance held the same viewpoint and wanted to continue using TNT. RDX had been tested by Picatinny Arsenal in 1929, and it was regarded as too expensive and too sensitive. The Navy proposed to continue using ammonium picrate. In contrast, the National Defense Research Committee (NDRC), who had visited The Royal Arsenal, Woolwich, thought new explosives were necessary. James B. Conant, chairman of Division B, wished to involve academic research into this area. Conant therefore set up an experimental explosives research laboratory at the Bureau of Mines, Bruceton, Pennsylvania, using Office of Scientific Research and Development (OSRD) funding.

Woolwich method
In 1941, the UK's Tizard Mission visited the U.S. Army and Navy departments and part of the information handed over included details of the "Woolwich" method of manufacture of RDX and its stabilisation by mixing it with beeswax. The UK was asking that the U.S. and Canada, combined, supply   (440,000 lb) of RDX per day. A decision was taken by William H. P. Blandy, chief of the Bureau of Ordnance, to adopt RDX for use in mines and torpedoes. Given the immediate need for RDX, the U.S. Army Ordnance, at Blandy's request, built a plant that copied the equipment and process used at Woolwich. The result was the Wabash River Ordnance Works run by E. I. du Pont de Nemours & Company. At that time, this works had the largest nitric acid plant in the world. The Woolwich process was expensive: it needed  of strong nitric acid for every pound of RDX.

By early 1941, the NDRC was researching new processes. The Woolwich or direct nitration process has at least two serious disadvantages: (1) it used large amounts of nitric acid and (2) at least one-half of the formaldehyde is lost. One mole of hexamethylenetetramine could produce at most one mole of RDX. At least three laboratories with no previous explosive experience were instructed to develop better production methods for RDX; they were based at Cornell, Michigan, and Pennsylvania State universities. Werner Emmanuel Bachmann, from Michigan, successfully developed the "combination process" by combining the Ross and Schiessler process used in Canada (aka the German E-method) with direct nitration. The combination process required large quantities of acetic anhydride instead of nitric acid in the old British "Woolwich process". Ideally, the combination process could produce two moles of RDX from each mole of hexamethylenetetramine.

The vast production of RDX could not continue to rely on the use of natural beeswax to desensitize the RDX. A substitute stabilizer based on petroleum was developed at the Bruceton Explosives Research Laboratory.

Bachmann process
The NDRC instructed three companies to develop pilot plants. They were the Western Cartridge Company, E. I. du Pont de Nemours & Company, and Tennessee Eastman Company, part of Eastman Kodak. At the Eastman Chemical Company (TEC), a leading manufacturer of acetic anhydride, Werner Emmanuel Bachmann developed a continuous-flow process for RDX utilizing an ammonium nitrate/nitric acid mixture as a nitrating agent in a medium of acetic acid and acetic anhydride. RDX was crucial to the war effort and the current batch-production process was too slow. In February 1942, TEC began producing small amounts of RDX at its Wexler Bend pilot plant, which led to the U.S. government authorizing TEC to design and build Holston Ordnance Works (H.O.W.) in June 1942. By April 1943, RDX was being manufactured there. At the end of 1944, the Holston plant and the Wabash River Ordnance Works, which used the Woolwich process, were producing  (50 million pounds) of Composition B per month.

The Bachmann process yields both RDX and HMX, with the major product determined by the specific reaction conditions.

Military compositions
The United Kingdom's intention in World War II was to use "desensitised" RDX. In the original Woolwich process, RDX was phlegmatized with beeswax, but later paraffin wax was used, based on the work carried out at Bruceton. In the event the UK was unable to obtain sufficient RDX to meet its needs, some of the shortfall was met by substituting amatol, a mixture of ammonium nitrate and TNT.

Karl Dönitz was reputed to have claimed that "an aircraft can no more kill a U-boat than a crow can kill a mole". Nonetheless, by May 1942 Wellington bombers began to deploy depth charges containing Torpex, a mixture of RDX, TNT, and aluminium, which had up to 50 percent more destructive power than TNT-filled depth charges. Considerable quantities of the RDX–TNT mixture were produced at the Holston Ordnance Works, with Tennessee Eastman developing an automated mixing and cooling process based around the use of stainless steel conveyor belts.

Terrorism
A Semtex bomb was used in the Pan Am Flight 103 (known also as the Lockerbie) bombing in 1988. The 1993 Bombay bombings used RDX placed into several vehicles as bombs. RDX was the main component used for the 2006 Mumbai train bombings and the Jaipur bombings in 2008. It also is believed to be the explosive used in the 2010 Moscow Metro bombings.

Traces of RDX were found on pieces of wreckage from 1999 Russian apartment bombings and 2004 Russian aircraft bombings. Further reports on the bombs used in the 1999 apartment bombings indicated that while RDX was not a part of the main charge, each bomb contained plastic explosive used as a booster charge.

Ahmed Ressam, the al-Qaeda Millennium Bomber, used a small quantity of RDX as one of the components in the bomb that he prepared to detonate in Los Angeles International Airport on New Year's Eve 1999-2000; the bomb could have produced a blast forty times greater than that of a devastating car bomb.

According to the Kenyan Police, the Iranians planned to use the RDX for "attacks on Israeli, US, UK and Saudi Arabian targets".

RDX was used in the assassination of Lebanese Prime Minister Rafic Hariri on February 14, 2005.

In the 2019 Pulwama attack in India, 250 kg of high-grade RDX was used by Jaish-e-Mohammed. The attack resulted in the deaths of 44 Central Reserve Police Force (CRPF) personnel as well as the attacker.

Stability
RDX has a high nitrogen content and a high oxygen to carbon ratio, (O:C ratio), both of which indicate its explosive potential for formation of N2 and CO2.

RDX undergoes a deflagration to detonation transition (DDT) in confinement and certain circumstances.

The velocity of detonation of RDX at a density of 1.76 g/cm3 is 8750 m/s.

It starts to decompose at approximately 170 °C and melts at 204 °C. At room temperature, it is very stable. It burns rather than explodes. It detonates only with a detonator, being unaffected even by small arms fire. This property makes it a useful military explosive. It is less sensitive than pentaerythritol tetranitrate (PETN). Under normal conditions, RDX has a Figure of Insensitivity of exactly 80 (RDX defines the reference point).

RDX sublimes in vacuum, which restricts or prevents its use in some applications.

RDX, when exploded in air, has about 1.5 times the explosive energy of TNT per unit weight and about 2.0 times per unit volume.

RDX is insoluble in water, with solubility 0.05975 g/L at temperature of 25 °C.

Toxicity
The substance's toxicity has been studied for many years. RDX has caused convulsions (seizures) in military field personnel ingesting it, and in munition workers inhaling its dust during manufacture. At least one fatality was attributed to RDX toxicity in a European munitions manufacturing plant.

During the Vietnam War, at least 40 American soldiers were hospitalized with composition C-4 (which is 91% RDX) intoxication from December 1968 to December 1969. C-4 was frequently used by soldiers as a fuel to heat food, and the food was generally mixed by the same knife that was used to cut C-4 into small pieces prior to burning. Soldiers were exposed to C-4 either due to inhaling the fumes, or due to ingestion, made possible by many small particles adhering to the knife having been deposited into the cooked food. The symptom complex involved nausea, vomiting, generalized seizures, and prolonged postictal confusion and amnesia; which indicated toxic encephalopathy.

Oral toxicity of RDX depends on its physical form; in rats, the LD50 was found to be 100 mg/kg for finely powdered RDX, and 300 mg/kg for coarse, granular RDX. A case has been reported of a human child hospitalized in status epilepticus following the ingestion of 84.82 mg/kg dose of RDX (or 1.23 g for the patient's body weight of 14.5 kg) in the "plastic explosive" form.

The substance has low to moderate toxicity with a possible human carcinogen classification. Further research is ongoing, however, and this classification may be revised by the United States Environmental Protection Agency (EPA). Remediating RDX-contaminated water supplies has proven to be successful. It is known to be a kidney toxin in humans and highly toxic to earthworms and plants, thus army testing ranges where RDX was used heavily may need to undergo environmental remediation. Concerns have been raised by research published in late 2017 indicating that the issue has not been addressed correctly by U.S. officials.

Civilian use
RDX has been used as a rodenticide because of its toxicity.

Biodegradation
RDX is degraded by the organisms in sewage sludge as well as the fungus Phanaerocheate chrysosporium. Both wild and transgenic plants can phytoremediate explosives from soil and water.

Alternatives
FOX-7 is considered to be approximately a 1-to-1 replacement for RDX in almost all applications.

See also
Russian apartment bombings

References

Bibliography

. See also .
 Urbański translation openlibrary.org, Macmillan, NY, 1964, .

Further reading

External links

 ADI Limited (Australia). Archive.org leads to Thales group products page that shows some military specifications.
 NLM Hazardous Substances Databank (US) – Cyclonite (RDX)
 CDC – NIOSH Pocket Guide to Chemical Hazards

 nla.gov.au, Army News (Darwin, NT), October 2, 1943, p 3. "Britain's New Explosive: Experts Killed in Terrific Blast", uses "Research Department formula X"
 nla.gov.au, The Courier-Mail (Brisbane, Qld.), September 27, 1943, p 1.

Explosive chemicals
Nitroamines
Triazines
Convulsants
GABAA receptor negative allosteric modulators
Rodenticides